Bernardin agriculture machinery brand are manufactured by Agroindustrial San Vicente, S.A. in San Vincente, Argentina. The brand was founded in 1925.

Bernardin is best known for the combines and implements that it builds, but it also manufactures tractors from 65 hp up to 260 hp, including articulated tractors. Other products include pull-type sprayers, drills, and self-propelled forage harvesters.

Production

Combines 
 Bernardin M15 
 Bernardin M17 
 Bernardin M19 
 Bernardin M20 
 Bernardin M21 
 Bernardin M23 
 Bernardin ML60 
 Bernardin M2120 
 Bernardin M2140 
 Bernardin M2160 
 Bernardin KG-6 "Poliese"  (picker harvester)

Implements 
 Bernardin FA5000 Omega 
 Bernardin PA 3500 Genesis 
 Bernardin PA 3500 Orion 
 Bernardin PAM 3000 
 Bernardin PA 2.5 
 Bernardin A 40

Tractors 
 Bernardin B190 DTA / B227 DTA / B230 DTA / B260 DTA

External links
Bernardin webpage

References 

Argentine brands